Bangladesh Jute Mills Corporation, often abbreviated and known as BJMC is a public corporation that owns and manages all government jute factories and industries in Bangladesh and is located in the capital city of Dhaka.

It also owns several public entities in various fields for its funding and revenue collection.

History
The corporation was formed in 1972 when the government of Bangladesh nationalised all the Jute Mills in the country. It manages Adamjee Jute Mills. It is responsible for nine state run  jute mills in Bangladesh. Team BJMC is a professional football team of the corporation. In 2016 the government announced plans to upgrade the jute mills spending US$340 million with Chinese assistance.

References

1972 establishments in Bangladesh
Government-owned companies of Bangladesh
Manufacturing companies based in Dhaka
Jute industry of Bangladesh
Textile companies of Bangladesh